Amer Delic was the defending champion; however, he lost to Brendan Evans in the quarterfinals.
Ryan Sweeting won in the final 6–4, 6–3, against Evans.

Seeds

Draw

Final four

Top half

Bottom half

Sources
 Main Draw

External links
 Qualifying Draw

Challenger of Dallas - Singles
2009 Singles